The list of shipwrecks in 1983 includes ships sunk, foundered, grounded, or otherwise lost during 1983.

January

1 January

15 January

19 January

25 January

30 January

February

5 February

12 February

14 February

16 February

23 February

24 February

27 February

March

10 March

11 March

12 March

13 March

15 March

31 March

Unknown date

April

1 April

3 April

4 April

6 April

11 April

12 April

14 April

16 April

19 April

20 April

23 April

28 April

Unknown date

May

2 May

6 May

16 May

30 May

June

3 June

5 June

23 June

29 June

Unknown date

July

Unknown date

August

2 August

6 August

10 August

11 August

12 August

13 August

24 August

25 August

28 August

September

1 September

4 September

5 September

10 September

23 September

25 September

October

3 October

3 October

7 October

10 October

26 October

27 October

Unknown date

November

6 November

19 November

21 November

23 November

26 November

December

3 December

3 December

15 December

18 December

30 December

Unknown date

References

See also 

1983
 
Ship